Ludovic Magnin (born 20 April 1979) is a Swiss football manager and a former player. He is the manager of Lausanne-Sport. He played as a left-back for the Switzerland national team, Yverdon Sport, FC Lugano, Werder Bremen, VfB Stuttgart, and FC Zürich.

Club career

Youth teams
Born in Lausanne, Magnin started his career at FC Echallens, where he played until 1996. He spent one season at Lausanne Sports before joining second-tier Yverdon Sports.

Switzerland and Germany
In 1999, he made his professional debut for Yverdon Sports. In the summer of 2000, he transferred to Ticino side FC Lugano, then playing in the first-tier Axpo Super League.

In the beginning of 2002, Magnin made his biggest career move by joining Bundesliga side Werder Bremen for the transfer sum of approximately 1 million Swiss Francs. He won the double of Bundesliga and DFB-Pokal with the Northern German side in 2004, but had bad luck with many injuries and played only 45 games in four years in Bremen.

In 2005, he transferred to Southern Germany, to Swabian side VfB Stuttgart. There Ludo, as he is being called by Stuttgart fans, became a first-team regular within the first season and was a key player for his team in the following 2006–07 season, when he became German champion for the second time in his career. In early 2008, he extended his contract until June 2010. When his starting position in the team began to erode in the beginning of the 2009–10 season, Magnin decided to leave Stuttgart in order to keep his chances of playing for the Swiss national squad at the 2010 World Cup. Therefore, he returned to his native country in January 2010, joining FC Zürich. Magnin made 103 appearances scoring two goals in four and a half years at VfB.

On 27 August 2012, Magnin announced that he had decided to end his playing career. Having suffered a back injury before the 2012–13 season, he expected to play until the end of the season, but shortly after admitted that it was impossible to remain as a player. He also mentioned that he would serve as an assistant coach of FC Zürich junior team.

International career
Magnin has acquired 61 caps and scored three goals for the Switzerland national team since his debut in 2000. He has been called up to the 2008 European Football Championship, where he has inherited the captaincy due to an injury to Alexander Frei and was the vice-captain after Frei. He also participated at the 2006 FIFA World Cup and the UEFA Euro 2004.

Magnin was initially omitted from the Switzerland squad for the 2010 World Cup but was later called up to replace the injured Christoph Spycher.

Managerial career

FC Zürich
On 20 February 2018, Magnin was announced as the new head coach of Swiss Super League club FC Zürich, replacing Ulrich Forte. His first trophy as a manager was the 2017–18 Swiss Cup, where Zürich beat Young Boys in the final on 27 May 2018. He was dismissed after more than two seasons in charge after a poor start to the 2020–21 season, which saw the club bottom of the league after three matchdays.

Rheindorf Altach
On 30 December 2021, Magnin became the new head coach of Austrian Football Bundesliga side Rheindorf Altach, who were bottom of the league. He signed a contract until 2023. On 20 May 2022, after a crucial 2–1 win over WSG Tirol, Altach avoided relegation by finishing one point ahead of Admira Wacker Mödling.

Lausanne-Sport
Three days after heeding Rheindorf Altach from relegation, Magnin was announced as the new head coach of his hometown club  Lausanne-Sport, who had recently been relegated to the Swiss Challenge League.

Career statistics

International

Scores and results list Switzerland's goal tally first, score column indicates score after each Magnin goal.

Managerial

Honours

Player
Werder Bremen
 Bundesliga: 2003–04
 DFB-Pokal: 2003–04

VfB Stuttgart
Bundesliga: 2006–07

Manager
FC Zürich
 Swiss Cup: 2017–18

References

External links
 
 

1979 births
Living people
Sportspeople from Lausanne
Association football fullbacks
Swiss men's footballers
Switzerland international footballers
Switzerland under-21 international footballers
UEFA Euro 2004 players
2006 FIFA World Cup players
UEFA Euro 2008 players
2010 FIFA World Cup players
Swiss Super League players
Bundesliga players
FC Lugano players
Yverdon-Sport FC players
FC Lausanne-Sport players
SV Werder Bremen players
VfB Stuttgart players
FC Zürich players
Swiss expatriate footballers
Expatriate footballers in Germany
Swiss expatriate sportspeople in Germany
Swiss football managers
FC Zürich managers
FC Lausanne-Sport managers
Austrian Football Bundesliga managers
Swiss expatriate football managers
Expatriate football managers in Austria
Swiss expatriate sportspeople in Austria